"Flashlight" is a song performed by Polish singer Kasia Moś. The song was released as a digital download on 10 March 2017. It represented Poland in the Eurovision Song Contest 2017, and was written by Moś, Pete Barringer and Rickard Bonde Truumeel.

The single peaked at number 55 on the Polish Airplay Chart.

Eurovision Song Contest

Moś was confirmed to be taking part in Krajowe Eliminacje 2017, Poland's national selection for the Eurovision Song Contest 2017, on 11 February 2017. Moś went on to win the national final, on 18 February, placing first with the juries and second with the public, and represented Poland in the Eurovision Song Contest 2017. Poland competed in the second half of the first semi-final at the Eurovision Song Contest.

Track listing

Charts

Weekly charts

Release history

References

Eurovision songs of Poland
Eurovision songs of 2017
2017 songs
2017 singles